Zoo Bar may refer to:

 Zoo Bar (Lincoln, Nebraska), a blues music venue and nightclub in Lincoln, Nebraska, U.S.A.
 Zoo Bar (Halifax, West Yorkshire), a nightclub in Halifax, West Yorkshire, England